Africallagma is a genus of damselfly in the family Coenagrionidae.

Species
Species include:

 Africallagma cuneistigma 
 Africallagma elongatum  - Slender Bluet
 Africallagma glaucum  - Swamp Bluet
 Africallagma pallidulum 
 Africallagma pseudelongatum  - Sprite Bluet
 Africallagma rubristigma 
 Africallagma sapphirinum  - Sapphire Bluet
 Africallagma sinuatum  - Peak Bluet
 Africallagma subtile  - Pale Bluet
 Africallagma vaginale

References

Coenagrionidae
Zygoptera genera
Taxonomy articles created by Polbot